Whitecross Hereford High School is a mixed secondary school located in Hereford in the English county of Herefordshire.

Previously a community school administered by Herefordshire Council, Whitecross Hereford High School converted to academy status in January 2013. However the school continues to coordinate with Herefordshire Council for admissions. The school moved into new buildings in 2006.

Whitecross Hereford High School offers GCSEs and BTECs as programmes of study for pupils. The school also has a specialism in sports, and is an accredited sports college. The school currently has a roll of around 1000 students. A new Head Teacher, Tim Knapp was appointed in 2016. Taking over from Denise Stutt, who held the position from 2001

References

External links
Whitecross Hereford High School official website
OFSTED Report 2014

Secondary schools in Herefordshire
Schools in Hereford
Academies in Herefordshire
Specialist sports colleges in England